3 Dots is a 2013 Malayalam comedy thriller film directed by Sugeeth. The film stars Kunchacko Boban, Biju Menon and Prathap K. Pothan with  Narain, Krishna Kumar, Janani Iyer, Sreedhanya and Anjana Menon in supporting roles. 3 Dots is being produced by Satish B Satish and Sugeeth under the banner of Ordinary Films.

Plot
Vishnu, Pappan and Louis are three ex-convicts who live together at Pappan's abode, trying to pick up from where they had let their lives off before being jailed. After many unsuccessful efforts to find employment, they appeal to Dr. Isaac, who was a counsellor in the prison. He suggests that they consider some form of self-employment and he will support them. Vishnu converts Pappan's Omni into an ambulance. Pappan runs a playschool and Louis works for a driving school run by a neighbour, Grace, a widow. But Dr. Isaac has some other intentions in supporting them and this forms the crux of the story.

Cast
 Kunchacko Boban as Vishnu, Lakshmi's Love Interest
 Biju Menon as Louis
 Prathap K. Pothan as Padmakumar / Pappettan
 Narain as Dr. Isaac Samuel
 Krishna Kumar as Mathew Paul
 Janani Iyer as Lakshmi, Vishnu's love interest
 Sreedhanya as Beena Mathew Paul
 Anjana Menon as Grace
 Vanitha Krishnachandran as Shoba
 Jaise Jose as Adv. Ravi Menon
Moideen Koya as News Reporter
 Dharmajan Bolgatty as Driving Student
 Sunil Sukhada as Person in Bar
 Niyas Backer as Manoharan

Soundtrack

References

External links
 

2013 films
Indian comedy thriller films
2010s Malayalam-language films
Films scored by Vidyasagar
Films directed by Sugeeth